Yemin Orde (Lit: "Orde Memorial") is a youth village near Haifa, Israel named for Orde Wingate.

History
Yemin Orde Youth Village was established in 1953 by the British Friends of Youth Aliyah. The name was given to commemorate British Major General Orde Charles Wingate, an ardent supporter of the Zionist cause and instrumental in the formation of the Israel Defense Forces. The village provides a safe haven for immigrant and at-risk children aged 5–19. The students hail from all the world.

A youth village patterned after the Israeli model was established in Rwanda.

Notable alumni
Usumain Baraka

See also
Education in Israel

References

Youth villages in Israel